Olga Aleksandrovna Makeeva (born November 21, 1974) is a statesman and political figure, diplomat. Ambassador extraordinary and plenipotentiary of the Donetsk People's Republic to the Russian Federation from May 6, 2022.

Deputy chairman People's Council Donetsk People's Republic (2015—2022).

Biography 
Olga Aleksandrovna Makeeva was born on November 21, 1974, at Donetsk.

He is a graduate of Donetsk National University (2002, specialty — jurisprudence).

In 1994-1996 — teacher of music at school.

Until 2014 — head of the legal service in a number of commercial organizations, then — in the state airline "Donbasaero".

In People's Council Donetsk People's Republic held the position of Chairman of the Committee on Constitutional Legislation and State Building.

From October 10, 2015, to May 6, 2022 — Vice-speaker People's Council of the Donetsk People's Republic.

From September 14 to November 19, 2018 — Acting chairman of the People's Council of the Donetsk People's Republic.

In the diplomatic service since 2022.

May 6, 2022 and by decree of the head DNR D.V. Pushilina appointed to the post of Ambassador extraordinary and plenipotentiary of the Donetsk People's Republic to the Russian Federation.

References

1974 births
Living people
Politicians from Donetsk
Pro-Russian people of the 2014 pro-Russian unrest in Ukraine
People of the Donetsk People's Republic
Pro-Russian people of the war in Donbas
Ukrainian collaborators with Russia